Caesium chromate or cesium chromate is an inorganic compound with the formula Cs2CrO4. It is a yellow crystalline solid that is the caesium salt of chromic acid, and it crystallises in the orthorhombic system. 

Its major application in the past was for the production of caesium vapour during vacuum tube manufacture. Currently it is only used as the precursor for other compounds of academic interest.

Preparation 
Caesium chromate is mainly obtained from the reaction of chromium(VI) oxide with caesium carbonate, wherein carbon dioxide gas is evolved:

 CrO3(aq) + Cs2CO3(aq) → Cs2CrO4(aq) + CO2(g)

Alternatively, salt metathesis between potassium chromate and caesium chloride can be performed:

 K2CrO4(aq) + 2 CsCl(aq) → Cs2CrO4(aq) + 2 KCl(aq)
Finally, caesium dichromate (itself derived via salt metathesis from ammonium dichromate) yields the chromate following alkalinisation with caesium hydroxide:
 Cs2Cr2O7(aq) + 2 CsOH(aq) → 2 Cs2CrO4(aq) + H2O(ℓ)

Applications 
Caesium chromate was formerly used in the final stages of creating vacuum tubes. Therein, caesium vapour was produced by reaction of caesium chromate with silicon, boron, or titanium as reducing agents. The vapour was then added to the tube to react with and remove remaining gases, including nitrogen and oxygen.

References

Caesium compounds
Chromates